Kevin Anthony "Moochie" Corcoran (June 10, 1949 – October 6, 2015) was an American child actor, director and producer. He appeared in numerous Disney projects between 1957 and 1963, leading him to be honored as a Disney Legend in 2006. His nickname, Moochie, established him as an irrepressible character in film.

Early life
Born in 1949 in Santa Monica, California, Corcoran was one of eight children. His father, William "Bill" Corcoran Sr. was a police officer and then director of maintenance at Metro-Goldwyn-Mayer studios. Corcoran's mother, the former Kathleen McKenney, was, like her husband, a native of Quincy, Massachusetts. Of his siblings most of whom did some acting in the late 1950s to early 1960s, Corcoran was the one whose work is best remembered.

Career
Between 1956 and 1960, Corcoran played several different (but similar) characters, each bearing the nickname "Moochie". Although he was never a Mouseketeer, Corcoran appeared in three Mickey Mouse Club serials, beginning with Adventure in Dairyland, where he played Moochie McCandless, a farmer's son. This was the first of Corcoran's many Disney credits. He soon returned, as Montgomery (Moochie) O'Hara, in two Spin and Marty serials, The Further Adventures of Spin and Marty and The New Adventures of Spin and Marty.

Corcoran appeared in a Mouseketeer outfit with the name Moochie across his chest just once. In Disneyland: The Fourth Anniversary Show (1957), "Mouseketeer" Moochie repeatedly badgers Walt Disney for information about Zorro. Also on the fourth anniversary show, aired on September 11, 1957, segments were shown of Rainbow Road to Oz, a live-action film about characters in the Land of Oz. Inspired by L. Frank Baum's Oz books, the film was to star some of the Mouseketeers, including Darlene Gillespie as Dorothy and Annette Funicello as Ozma, as well as Tommy Kirk and Corcoran.

Continuing his fictional Moochie roles, Corcoran played Montgomery "Moochie" Daniels in the 1959 Disney film The Shaggy Dog. He also starred as Moochie Morgan in Moochie of the Little League (1959) and Moochie of Pop Warner Football (1960), both for the Disney anthology series. Character actor Russ Conway played his father.

In each iteration, Moochie likes to hang out with the older "guys" (big brother Wilby in The Shaggy Dog, the title characters in Spin and Marty), and hates being treated like the little kid he is. His determination to emulate elder peers despite adult warnings (swimming, helping Wilby, even switch-hitting) frequently gets him in trouble, but Moochie's bravado always returns soon afterward. Film writer Donald Liebenson has called Corcoran's character "part All-American boy and part hellion."

Other childhood roles
Corcoran appeared in numerous Disney projects (and a handful of non-Disney ones) without the Moochie name. He starred as Toby, an orphan who runs off to join the circus, in Toby Tyler, or Ten Weeks with a Circus (1960). He also starred in Disney's Johnny Shiloh in the title role. These were the only two theatrical films in which Corcoran had the lead roles. Important co-starring roles include the following:
 Old Yeller (1957) — younger son Arliss Coates
 The Shaggy Dog (1959) — younger son Moochie Daniels
 The Rabbit Trap (1959) — Duncan Colt
 Goliath II (1960) — Goliath II (voice)
 Pollyanna (1960) — Pollyanna's friend, orphan Jimmy Bean
 Swiss Family Robinson (1960) — youngest son Francis Robinson
 Daniel Boone (1960 Disney miniseries) — son James Boone
 Toby Tyler (1960) — Toby Tyler
 Babes in Toyland (1961) — nursery rhyme character Boy Blue
 Aquamania (1961) — Goofy Jr. (voice)
 Bon Voyage! (1962) — younger son Skipper Willard
 The Mooncussers (1962 Disney TV movie) — Jonathan Feather
 Johnny Shiloh (1963 Disney TV movie) — Union Army drummer (later sergeant) Johnny Lincoln Clem
 Savage Sam (1963) — Arliss Coates again
 A Tiger Walks (1964) — Tom Hadley
 Blue (1968) — Rory Calvin

Kevin Corcoran and Tommy Kirk played brothers in five films, beginning with 1957's Old Yeller, and Kevin always played the role of a rambunctious animal lover who would try to catch and befriend various animals, ranging from cuddly puppies to dangerous animals like tigers and bears. The other films in this category were The Shaggy Dog (1959), Swiss Family Robinson (1960), Bon Voyage! (1962) and Savage Sam (sequel to Old Yeller, 1963). Fred MacMurray played their father in The Shaggy Dog and Bon Voyage!; Dorothy McGuire played their mother in Old Yeller and Swiss Family Robinson. 

In 1961, he did the voice of Goofy Jr. in the animated short Aquamania. He played a role in Wagon Train in the episode “The Cassie Vance Story”.

Corcoran largely retired from acting after A Tiger Walks, although he also appeared in the 1968 film Blue in a minor role. In an interview for the DVD release of The Shaggy Dog, he credits his studio teachers with having prepared him well for his college studies.

Adult career
Corcoran graduated from California State University, Northridge with a degree in theatre arts. After this he returned to Disney, this time working behind the camera as an assistant director and producer. His credits from this era include Superdad (1973), The Island at the Top of the World (1974) and Pete's Dragon (1977).  He also worked on The New Mickey Mouse Club (1977). He was an associate producer on Treasure of Matecumbe (1976), on the sequel Return from Witch Mountain (1978) and on The North Avenue Irregulars (1979). He co-produced Herbie Goes Bananas (1980), and was the producer of the comedy television series Herbie, the Love Bug (1982) and Zorro and Son (1983). Corcoran's later contributions to Disney included commentaries and interviews on such Disney DVD releases as The Shaggy Dog and Pollyanna.

He also served as first assistant director on several non-Disney television series, including Scarecrow and Mrs. King, Quantum Leap, Profiler and Karen Sisco; and produced a number of projects. Over the course of his tenure on the Angela Lansbury series Murder, She Wrote, he was credited as first assistant director, assistant producer, and director.

Personal life
Kevin Corcoran was the brother of Donna Corcoran, Noreen Corcoran, Hugh Corcoran, Brian Corcoran, Kerry Corcoran, and Kelly Corcoran. Another brother, Bill Corcoran Jr., former dean of students at California State University, Fresno, died in 2007. Elder siblings Donna, Noreen, and Hugh Corcoran have extensive film and television credits as child actors during the 1950s. 

Kevin Corcoran and his wife, Laura Soltwedel, were married from 1972 until his death on October 6, 2015.

Death
Corcoran was diagnosed with colorectal cancer at age 60. He died from this illness at age 66 on October 6, 2015. His remains were cremated by the Neptune Society, and his ashes were scattered into the Pacific Ocean ten days later.

Honors
Kevin Corcoran was honored as a Disney Legend on October 9, 2006. Among the other recipients at the 2006 ceremony were the two lead actors in Corcoran's Spin and Marty serials, Tim Considine and David Stollery, and Corcoran's frequent co-star, Tommy Kirk, who was a veteran of The Mickey Mouse Club serials about The Hardy Boys.

References

Bibliography
 Best, Marc. Those Endearing Young Charms: Child Performers of the Screen. (South Brunswick: Barnes & Co., 1971), pp. 50–55.
 Cotter, Bill. The Wonderful World of Disney Television: A Complete History. Hyperion, 1997.

External links

Allmovie bio
Disney Legends profile
Profile on The Original Mickey Mouse Club Show website
Fun with Moochie

1949 births
2015 deaths
American male child actors
American male film actors
American male voice actors
American male television actors
Deaths from cancer in California
Deaths from colorectal cancer
California State University, Northridge alumni
Disney people
Film directors from Los Angeles